Evolutionary systems are a type of system, which reproduce with mutation whereby the most fit elements survive, and  the less fit die down. One of the developers of the evolutionary systems thinking is Béla H. Bánáthy. Evolutionary systems are characterized by "moving equilibria and the dynamics of coevolutionary interactions which can not be foreseen ex ante." The study of evolutionary systems  is an important subcategory of Complex Systems research.

See also 
 Biological system
 Emergent organization
 Evolutionary computation
 Evolutionary systems development

References

Further reading 
 Bentley, Peter, and David Corne. Creative evolutionary systems. Morgan Kaufmann, 2002.
 Csanyi, Vilmos. Evolutionary systems and society: a general theory. Durham, Duke University Press. (1989).
 Hommes, Carsien Harm. "Financial markets as nonlinear adaptive evolutionary systems." Tinbergen Institute Discussion Paper, No. 01-014/1 (2001)
 Rocha, Luis Mateus. "Selected self-organization and the semiotics of evolutionary systems." Evolutionary Systems: The Biological and Epistemological Perspectives on Selection and Self- Organization, . S. Salthe, G. Van de Vijver, and M. Delpos (eds.). Kluwer Academic Publishers, (1998) pp. 341–358.

Systems theory